The Shuili Snake Kiln Ceramics Cultural Park is a ceramic kiln in Dingkan Village, Shuili Township, Nantou County, Taiwan.

Name
The name Snake came from the long and narrow shape of the kiln, resembling a snake.

History
The kiln was built in 1927 where it used to produce large jars and other ceramics. It was founded by ceramic artist master Jiang Song Lin.

Architecture
The building consists of the culture museum, ceramic classroom and multimedia room.

See also
 List of tourist attractions in Taiwan

References

External links

 

1927 establishments in Taiwan
Buildings and structures in Nantou County
Kilns in Taiwan
Tourist attractions in Nantou County
Ceramics museums in Taiwan